James Porter Fry (1880 – 7 February 1948) was a member of the Queensland Legislative Assembly.

Biography
Fry was born in West End, Queensland, the son of Charles Fry and his wife Caroline (née Davies). he was educated at West End State School and in World War I he joined the AIF with at first, the 3rd Infantry Battalion where he was a member of the Special Tropical Corps in November 1914 and later the 9th Battalion where he was stationed in France.  He returned to Australia in late 1915 with the rank of Major.

In 1918 he became an optometrist. He married Sarah Chegwin (died 1957) in 1902 and they had one son and one daughter. Fry died in February 1948 at Redcliffe and was buried in the Toowong Cemetery.

Public career
Fry held the seat of Kurilpa, first for the National then later the Queensland United Party and the Country and Progressive National Party in the Queensland Legislative Assembly from 1918 until his defeat by Labor's Patrick Copley in 1932.

References

Members of the Queensland Legislative Assembly
1880 births
1948 deaths
20th-century Australian politicians
National Party (Queensland, 1917) members of the Parliament of Queensland